Phyllis Bartholomew (19 April 1914 – 26 January 2002) was an English track and field athlete who competed in the long jump event during her career. She was born in Reading, Berkshire. She won the gold medal in the long jump at the 1934 British Empire Games, and set her personal best (5.69 metres) on 9 July 1932 at a meet in London. She married Manuel Braz in Reading in 1937. The couple later moved to Portugal, where Braz died in 1975 and Bartholomew died in January 2002 at the age of 87.

References

External links
trackfield.brinkster

1914 births
2002 deaths
Athletes (track and field) at the 1934 British Empire Games
British female long jumpers
Commonwealth Games gold medallists for England
Commonwealth Games medallists in athletics
English female long jumpers
Sportspeople from Reading, Berkshire
Medallists at the 1934 British Empire Games